There were two Indian Buddhist masters named Buddhabhadra in China, both lived during the 5th century CE:

 Buddhabhadra (Shaolin abbot)
 Buddhabhadra (translator)